The colors pink and blue are associated with girls and boys respectively, in the United States, the United Kingdom and some other European countries.

Originating as a trend in the mid-19th century and applying primarily to clothing, gendered associations with pink and blue became more widespread from the 1950s onward. Since the 1990s, these gendered associations have also increasingly applied to toys as well, especially in the case of pink toys for girls.

Despite popular belief—including from various academic and popular sources—a reported "pink-blue reversal", wherein the gendered associations of both colors were "flipped" sometime during the 20th century, most likely never occurred, and instead is likely to have been a misunderstanding of earlier reporting.

History 

According to Jo Paoletti, who spent two decades studying the history of pink and blue gender-coding, there were no particular color associations for girls and boys at the turn of the 20th century. There was no agreement among manufacturers about which colors were feminine or masculine, or whether there were any such colors at all.

First half of the 20th century 

Children's clothing began to be differentiated by gender in matters of cut, pockets, images, and decoration, but not by color. During the period 1900-1930, the fashions of young boys began to change in style, but not color. Pink and blue were used together as "baby colors". Birth announcements and baby books used both colors well into the 1950s, and then gradually became accepted as feminine and masculine colors. Styles and colors formerly considered neutral, including flowers, dainty trim, and the color pink, became more associated with only girls and women. Paoletti summarized the evolution of pink and blue associations with girls and boys: "It is clear that pink-blue gender coding was known in the late 1860s but was not dominant until the 1950s in most parts of the United States and not universal until a generation later."

In 1927, a chart published in Time magazine summarized the recommended hues at major department stores in the United States: six said pink for boys and blue for girls; four said the opposite.

Second half of the 20th century 

A number of personalities and cultural icons of the 1950s and early 1960s had a great influence on the public awareness and use of pink in fashion and decoration, including Mamie Eisenhower, Marilyn Monroe, and Brigitte Bardot.

Mamie Eisenhower was influential in the growing shift among women in the United States, and to some extent abroad, towards the association between pink and women's fashion and decorating.  Mrs. Eisenhower was well known for preferring pink both in clothing and home decoration well before she became first lady, and more so after 1952 with the election of her husband Dwight D. Eisenhower as President of the United States. So much so, that a particular shade, known as "Mamie Pink" was named after her. When she took up residence in the White House in January 1953 she brought her favorite color with her, wearing a pink gown covered in pink rhinestones to the inaugural balls, and redecorating the White House in pink, to such an extent that it became known among the press corps as "The Pink Palace". Her tastes were picked up by the American public, and "Mamie Pink" became an iconic color in decorating in the 1950s, being used in bathroom fixtures, tiles, kitchen appliances, and more.

Marilyn Monroe was already famous as a sex symbol in the early 1950s when the film Gentlemen Prefer Blondes came out. The musical comedy featured Marilyn in the most famous musical number in the film, Diamonds Are a Girl's Best Friend, in a now iconic floor length, skin-tight silk dress in shocking pink with a big bow on the back and matching shoulder length gloves. Marilyn defined femininity and seduction and her influence never ended.

Brigitte Bardot wore checkered pink gingham as her wedding dress for her wedding in 1959. This was formerly a material used only for curtains and created a sensation, and was widely copied and influential.

Colored items

Clothing 

For infant and children's clothing, ribbons, and other items, the pink for girls, blue for boys associations known in  European countries included: the Netherlands (1823), France (1834), Russia (1842), Great Britain (1862), and Spain (1896); and in the Americas: in the United States, and Mexico (1899).

A contrarian tendency to avoid gendered clothing colors for children and towards more unisex clothing in the United States began in the late 1960s, influenced by the Baby Boomer generation reaching child-bearing age, and the effects of second-wave feminism.

Toys 

In the United States, girlie-girl culture developed in the 1990s in the wake of a series of successful Disney animated films, starting with Little Mermaid (1989). These animated films were heavily marketed to girls, especially, and pink was everywhere in marketing campaigns as they took advantage of what appeared to be a strong association between gender and certain colors: bold colors for boys, pastel colors for girls, especially pink. Eighty-six percent of pink toys were marketed as "girls only", and a similar percentage that were bold red, black, brown, or gray were for "boys only". Pink became a strong signal to girls and their parents about which products were being marketed to them.

Awareness ribbons 

A pink awareness ribbon is used as a symbol for breast cancer awareness, and are commonly seen in October during Breast Cancer Awareness Month. The color pink was chosen for the ribbon in 1992, as a symbol of breast cancer awareness.

Breast cancer organizations use the pink ribbon to associate themselves with breast cancer, to promote breast cancer awareness, and to support fundraising.  Pink evokes traditional feminine gender roles, caring for other people, being beautiful, being good, and being cooperative.
Some breast cancer-related organizations, such as Pink Ribbon International use the pink ribbon as their primary symbol. Susan G. Komen for the Cure uses a stylized "running ribbon" as their logo.

Gender reveal accessories 

Gender reveal parties use props or accessories of various kinds to reveal to invited guests the sex of an expectant mother's baby before it is born. Props include cakes, balloons, confetti, smoke, fireworks, and other accessories to indicate whether the fetus is male or female, normally by means of a colored signal that is pink or blue.  For example: a cake may be brought out, frosted in white or other neutrally-colored icing, which when cut, reveals a pinkish or blueish filling inside, thus indicating that the baby is expected to be a girl (pink) or a boy (blue).

Other 

Even items that would seem to have no association with one gender or another, such as vitamin pills, have been produced in pink and blue and marketed towards girls and boys. Société Bic drew criticism in 2012 for its pink and purple "Bic Cristal for Her" ballpoint pens.

Pink–blue reversal 

In a 2017 letter to Archives of Sexual Behavior, researcher Marco Del Giudice commented on earlier claims about a supposed shift in pink–blue color associations or preferences sometime around the 1940s, from pink for boys and blue for girls before that period, to the opposite alignment afterward. He summarized his earlier work from 2012 which found "no evidence of either reversed or inconsistent usage prior to the 1940s". Del Giudice called this theory the "Pink–blue reversal" (PBR), and said it was "usually attributed to [Jo] Paoletti", and quoted from five academic articles that reprised the theory of "pink is for boys" prior to the 1940s. However, he found upon analysis that it was exceptionally difficult to actually document such a shift, and exclaimed upon "the thinness of the evidence presented in support of the PBR".

In his 2012 paper, Del Giudice quoted from four articles published in academic journals which all echoed the claims about PBR theory, many relying on Paoletti, including : "Prior to that decade, Paoletti ... noted that the sex-dimorphic color coding of pink and blue was inverted, i.e., infant boys were dressed in pink and infant girls were dressed in blue."; : "At one point, pink was considered more of a boy's color ... blue was considered more for girls."; : "the current stereotypical American assignment of pink to girls and blue to boys was reversed a century ago"; and :  "Yet, in the first two decades of the twentieth century, there is evidence that the gender-dimorphic nature of these two colors was inverted, that is, blue was judged to be stereotypically feminine whereas pink was judged to be stereotypically masculine." But Paoletti never made the claim that pink and blue reversed, only that there was inconsistent usage that took until the 1950s to resolve starting from the first appearances of gendered pink and blue color associations around the 1860s.

Academic research 

A 2007 British study found a preference among women for reddish colors, and theorized that it might have had evolutionary advantages.

Studies of color preferences of infants and toddlers found a preference for primary colors, with no differences between boys and girls. By the age of two, girls started to prefer pink, and by four, boys started to reject it. This is around the same time as infants start to become aware of gender.

In an attempt to test previous research indicating an apparent preference in Britain for blue-green hues among males and pink-purple among females, a 2018 cross-cultural study compared Indian and British students. Standardized personality tests were administered to determine links possible between personality traits, gender, and color. Results confirmed previous studies, showing similar gender differences across both culture groups, with females in both groups showing a preference for pink, in warmer shades for Indian women and cooler for British women. Authors reported "a remarkable cross-cultural similarity in men and a subtle but significant cultural difference in women whose origin is yet to be explained".

Results of a cross-sectional study of color preferences among Swiss children and adults were published in 2018 in Sex Roles. The study found that blue was not a gendered color, but that pink is. Among children, blue was the favorite color of both girls and boys. There was a greater preference for pink/purple hues among girls, and a greater preference for red among boys. Among adults, no group chose pink as their favorite, blue was a common favorite among both, and women preferred red more than men did. A further study tested positive or negative emotional associations of pink, blue, and red among Swiss adults using the Geneva Emotion Wheel. All three hues were associated with positive emotions to the same extent among men and women. Where there were gender-based differences, pink was found to elicit more positive associations among women.

Most studies have taken place in western industrialized societies, and some evidence appeared to show a cross-cultural pattern. A 2019 study published in Perception was designed to test this hypothesis, and was conducted among a hunter-gatherer culture in Africa.  The study found that the color preferences among the Hadza people in Tanzania differed from those of previous studies, and that their color preferences were the same for men and for women. The researchers concluded that their study called into question previous hypotheses that color preference might have an innate association with gender, and suggested that more studies would be needed to determine what the actual factors are in color preferences among the genders.

Research questioning the color preferences of male and female children in regard to specific products is minimal; however,  analysis of the research available implies that there are common color preferences among boys and girls in relation to their clothing choice. In a study conducted in Turkey, the aim was to identify which colors are preferred for which garment types by girls and boys, and whether or not the color preferences of children differ according to age, sex, and garment type. It was determined that the colors preferred most by most of the girls for all garment types were magenta, red-violet, red, and red-orange; similarly, the colors preferred by the boys for all garment types were black, blue, cyan, and yellow. Despite the lack of cross cultural analysis on this topic, existing research indicates that children's clothing resides on a spectrum that has expectations which fluctuate depending on age, gender, location, class, and many more intersectional markers.

Reactions 

The association of pink with little girls and their toys leads some to view pink for women as unserious or infantilizing. In a 2017 column in The Washington Post, columnist Petula Dvorak wrote about her fears that the Women's March scheduled for the day after the inauguration of President Trump in January 2017 would not be taken seriously, because of the proliferation of pink pussy hats being prepared for the occasion by women planning to attend.

The same connection can be drawn between men and the potential for limitations associated with the color blue in western society. Often times men are marketed clothing and products that are associated with their socially acceptable color scheme of various blues, greens, and dark tones, this is something that can be observed in advertising as well as store fronts. With this push for a connection between blue and masculinity, there can be instances of gender backlash which refers to social penalties directed at people who violate gender norms. More specifically, the angry, moral outrage created by the violation of prescriptive stereotypes can lead to social or economic penalties for the stereotype violator (e.g., dislike or not being hired for a position). It is not uncommon for young boys to experience negative comments pertaining to their perceived femininity when wearing clothing that others perceive as less masculine. Males who display behaviors associated with femininity can experience negative repercussions that bleed into other areas of their lives as well, studies have shown that males who engage in behaviors associated with women are perceived as possessing fewer desirable masculine traits (e.g., competence and assertiveness) and more undesirable feminine traits (e.g., weakness and uncertainty), resulting in various social penalties.

See also 

 Blue
 Baby blue
 Children's clothing
 Color analysis (art)
 Color code
 Color psychology
 Color symbolism
 Gender reveal party
 Gender stereotypes
 Girls' toys and games
 Kruithof curve
 Let Toys Be Toys
 List of historical sources for pink and blue as gender signifiers
 Pink
 Pink ribbon
 Pink ribbon culture
 Pink Ribbons, Inc.
 Pinkstinks
 Pinkwashing (breast cancer)

References

Works cited 

 

 

 

 

 

 

 

 

 

 

 

 

 

 

 

 

 

 </ref>

 

 

 

 

 

 
 

 

 , p. 124

 </ref>

Further reading

External links 

 A Cultural History of Fashion's Most Controversial Color

Gender-related stereotypes
Stereotypes of women
Stereotypes of men
Color in culture